Bruno Mascarenhas (born 16 July 1981 in Lisbon) is an Italian rower.

References 
 
 

1981 births
Living people
Italian male rowers
Sportspeople from Lisbon
Olympic rowers of Italy
Rowers at the 2004 Summer Olympics
Rowers at the 2008 Summer Olympics
Olympic bronze medalists for Italy
Olympic medalists in rowing
Medalists at the 2004 Summer Olympics
World Rowing Championships medalists for Italy
European Rowing Championships medalists